Ronald Masocha (born 3 January 1999) is a Zimbabwean cricketer. He made his List A debut on 14 February 2020, for Mid West Rhinos in the 2019–20 Pro50 Championship. In December 2020, he was selected to play for the Rhinos in the 2020–21 Logan Cup. He made his first-class debut on 18 February 2022, for Rhinos in the 2021–22 Logan Cup in Zimbabwe.

References

External links
 

1999 births
Living people
Zimbabwean cricketers
Mid West Rhinos cricketers
Place of birth missing (living people)